TOP gogo (TOP გოგო) is a Georgian reality television show. Georgian model Salome Gviniashvili assumed the role of the head of the search as well as a mentor and judge for the contestants for the first season. She was replaced by Nino Tskitishvili (ნინო ცქიტიშვილი) for season two.

The premise of the series is documenting a group of young female aspiring models who live together in a house for several weeks, while they take part in various challenges, photo-shoots, and meetings with members of the modeling industry. One or more poor-performing contestants are eliminated  from the competition each week, until the last contestant remaining is declared the winner, and receives a modeling contract along with other associated prizes.

The first season premiered on May 13, 2012 and ended, after a break in the airing of the show, in October. A second season featuring contestants from Belarus, Georgia, Kazakhstan, Latvia, Russia and Ukraine began to air on January 24, 2013.

Cycles

References

2012 Georgia (country) television series debuts
Modeling-themed television series
Georgia (country) television series
2010s Georgia (country) television series
Rustavi 2 original programming